Trachipterus arcticus is a species of ribbonfish found predominantly in the North Atlantic Ocean, with one report from the Mediterranean Sea. They are rarely encountered by humans due to their deep-sea habitat and the fact that they are of no commercial value. This species is commonly referred to as the dealfish to differentiate it from the nine other ribbonfish species in the family Trachipteridae.

Appearance 

Dealfish have a long, slender eel-like body. They are a bright silver in colour, often with faint black spots along the flanks and the pink dorsal fin runs the full length of the body. The tail is very small and the underside is free of pectoral or pelvic fins. The maximum size of this species is thought to be 8–9 feet in length, although they are typically around half of this size.

Distribution and habitat 

Dealfish are mostly found in the North Atlantic Ocean from Norway and Iceland to Madeira Islands. They are also present in the North Sea and in the Mediterranean Sea (one record). They are also found off along the coast of the United States of America (which is also possibly a separate species). Dealfish are generally found far out to sea and far away from land masses in waters of around 300 to 1000 metres deep. While they are found in deep water they do not live or feed on the seabed and instead live in the pelagic (mid-water) zone. Dealfish are thought to feed predominately by hunting small fish and squid.

Life cycle 

The life cycle and behaviour of the dealfish is relatively poorly understood. They are thought to spend most of their life as a solitary creature, but form into large shoals/groups from time to time. It is currently unknown whether this is done for feeding, spawning or some other purpose. Dealfish are not recognised as a food fish anywhere in the world, and are of no interest at all to commercial fisheries, with any dealfish caught by commercial vessels usually being discarded at sea. Due to being a deep-water species dealfish are rarely encountered by humans. However, dealfish do wash up on beaches from time to time, although it is unknown why this is the case.

Second species of dealfish 

There is evidence that dealfish should be divided into two separate species, as dealfish found in the Northern and Western Atlantic show some genetic differences.

References 

Lampriformes
Fish of the Atlantic Ocean
Fish described in 1771
Taxa named by Morten Thrane Brünnich